Jens Müller (born 6 July 1965 in Torgau, Bezirk Leipzig) is an East German-German luger who competed from 1985 to 2001. He won two medals at the Winter Olympics in men's singles with a gold at Calgary in 1988 and a bronze at Nagano in 1998.

Müller started for the ASK Vorwärts Oberhof and the BSR "Rennsteig" Oberhof. During his career, he won 14 medals at the FIL World Luge Championships, including four gold (Men's singles: 2000, Mixed team: 1990, 1991, 1995), seven silvers (Men's singles: 1987, 1989, 1999; Mixed team: 1989, 1996, 1997, 2000), and three bronzes (Men's singles: 1985, 1990, 1996).

At the FIL European Luge Championships, Müller won eight medals. This included five golds (Men's singles: 1996, 2000; Mixed team: 1990, 1996, 1998), two silvers (Men's singles: 1986; Mixed team: 1988), and one bronze (Men's singles: 1990). In Luge World Cup, Müller's best overall finish in men's singles was second three times (1988-9, 1996-7, 1999-2000).

Müller has been an honorary citizen of Ilmenau, Thuringia since 1988. He is also a skeleton coach, working with racers such as Diane Sartor and Kerstin Jürgens.

References
FIL-Luge profile

External links
 

1965 births
Living people
People from Torgau
People from Bezirk Leipzig
German male lugers
Sportspeople from Saxony
Olympic lugers of East Germany
Olympic lugers of Germany
National People's Army military athletes
Lugers at the 1988 Winter Olympics
Lugers at the 1992 Winter Olympics
Lugers at the 1994 Winter Olympics
Lugers at the 1998 Winter Olympics
Olympic gold medalists for East Germany
Olympic bronze medalists for Germany
Olympic medalists in luge
Medalists at the 1988 Winter Olympics
Medalists at the 1998 Winter Olympics
Recipients of the Patriotic Order of Merit in gold